Ralph Allen (1693 – 29 June 1764) was an entrepreneur and philanthropist, who was notable for his reforms to the British postal system.

Allen was born in Cornwall but moved to Bath to work in the post office, becoming the postmaster at the age of 19. He made the system more efficient and took over contracts for the mail system to cover England to the borders of Scotland and into South Wales. He bought local stone mines from his postal profits and had Prior Park built as his house to show off the versatility of the local Bath stone, using the old post office as his town house. With the architect John Wood the Elder, the stone he mined was used in the building work for the development of the Georgian city. However, the mines did not consistently make a profit and Allen subsidised them from his postal profits.

After his death, he was buried in a pyramid-topped tomb in Claverton churchyard. He is commemorated in the names of streets and schools in the city of Bath and was the model for Squire Allworthy in the novel Tom Jones by Henry Fielding.

Early life

Much is unknown or obscure regarding Allen's early life. The Oxford Dictionary of National Biography gives his father as Philip Allen, reputed to be an innkeeper. As a teenager, Allen worked at the Post Office at St Columb, run by his grandmother. He moved in 1710 to Bath, where he became a post office clerk, and at the age of 19, in 1712, became the Postmaster of Bath. In 1742 he was elected Mayor of Bath.

Involvement in the postal system
At the age of 27 Allen took control of the Cross and Bye Posts in the South West under a seven-year contract with the General Post Office, although he had no official title. At the end of this period he had not made a profit, only breaking even. But he had the courage to continue – with breathtaking success.

Over the next few years, he reformed the postal service. He realised that post boys were delivering items of mail along their route without them being declared and that this was lost profit. He introduced a "signed for system" that prevented the malpractice. He also improved efficiency by not requiring mail to go via London.

Ralph Allen's reputation grew and he took over more and more of the English postal system, signing contracts every seven years until he died aged 71. It is estimated that he saved the Post Office £1,500,000 over a 40-year period. He won the patronage of General Wade in 1715, when he disclosed details of a Jacobite uprising in Cornwall.

Quarrying of Bath stone
With the arrival of John Wood in Bath, Allen used the wealth gained from his postal reforms to acquire the stone quarries at Combe Down and Bathampton Down Mines. Hitherto, the quarry masons had always hewn stone roughly providing blocks of varying size. The resulting uneven surface is known as "rubble" and buildings of this type – built during the Stuart period – are visible throughout the older parts of Bath.

The distinctive honey-coloured Bath stone, used to build the Georgian city, made Allen a second fortune. The building in Lilliput Alley, Bath (now North Parade Passage), which he used as a post office, became his Town House and in 1727 he refronted the southern rubble wall, extended the house to the north and added a new storey. John Wood the Elder refers to this in his "Essay towards the future of Bath". Allen was astute at marketing the qualities of Bath stone and erected an elaborately ornate building a few feet to the north of his house to demonstrate its qualities. The extension (as Wood refers to it) has become known as "Ralph Allen's Town House", though whether it was designed by Wood is unproven and many local historians consider it unlikely. Allen continued to live there until 1745, when he moved to Prior Park, and the townhouse became his offices.

Allen had the Palladian mansion of Prior Park built (1742) on a hill overlooking the city, "To see all Bath, and for all Bath to see". He gave money and the stone for the building of the Mineral Water Hospital in central Bath 1738. In 1758 he bought Claverton Manor, just east of Bath.

Allen had a summer home built in the coastal town of Weymouth in Dorset, overlooking the harbour at number 2 Trinity street, opposite the Customs House. There is a plaque on the house to commemorate Allen. His Bath stone was used in the Georgian buildings of Weymouth.

Commemoration
Ralph Allen is buried in a pyramid-topped tomb in Claverton churchyard, on the outskirts of Bath. A marble bust stood in the Mineral Water Hospital (later the Royal National Hospital for Rheumatic Diseases) and was moved to the hospital's new building at Combe Park in 2019.

His name is commemorated in Ralph Allen Drive which runs past his former home at Prior Park.  Now a busy road from Combe Down village to Bath city centre, this was the route by which the stone from his quarries at Combe Down was sent on wooden sledges down to the River Avon. Prior Park College, a private school for 11- to 18-year-olds, is housed in Allen's former home and incorporates a boys' boarding house named Allen House. The Prior Park Landscape Garden and Palladian bridge are cared for by the National Trust, who brought the garden back from dereliction in 1993. He is also remembered in Ralph Allen School, one of the city's state secondary schools.

The Ralph Allen CornerStone in Combe Down village opened in the autumn of 2013.  This houses the archives of the Combe Down Heritage Society and provides a community hub and information centre as part of the legacy of the project to infill the stone mines underneath the village.

Henry Fielding used Allen as the model for Squire Allworthy in the novel Tom Jones.

Bibliography

Hopkins, A.E. (ed.) (1960) Ralph Allen's own narrative, 1720–1761

See also

Bath Postal Museum

References

External links
 Ralph Allen at the National Portrait Gallery, London
 Allen, Ralph (1694–1764) Philanthropist at the National Register of Archives
 Prior Park Landscape Garden, National Trust

1693 births
1764 deaths
British postmasters
18th-century English businesspeople
English philanthropists
People from St Columb Major

Postal pioneers
Mayors of Bath, Somerset
18th-century British philanthropists
Combe Down